Little Somerford railway station served the village of Little Somerford, Wiltshire, England from 1903 to 1962. It was on the South Wales Main Line and served as the junction for the Malmesbury branch line from 1933.

History 
In 1903 the Great Western Railway opened the South Wales Main Line which provided a more direct route to South Wales, passing close to the south of Little Somerford village and to the north of the earlier line. A small station at Little Somerford was opened on the day the line was opened to passengers, 1 July 1903.

In 1933 the connection of the branch to the main line network was altered so that the branch began at Little Somerford, and the section south to Dauntsey was closed. Thus from 17 July 1933 Little Somerford became a junction, until the branch was closed (to passengers in September 1951 and completely in November 1962). Main line passenger service at the station was withdrawn in April 1961 and goods traffic in June 1963.

References 

Disused railway stations in Wiltshire
Former Great Western Railway stations
Railway stations in Great Britain opened in 1903
Railway stations in Great Britain closed in 1961
1903 establishments in England
1961 disestablishments in England